Prakash Jwala (born 27 November 1966) is a Nepali politician who served in the House of Representatives from 1999 until 2008 and in the Karnali Provincial Assembly from 2018 until his expulsion in April 2021, representing the Salyan 1 constituency as a member of the Communist Party of Nepal (Unified Marxist–Leninist). After his expulsion, Jwala joined the newly-formed Communist Party of Nepal (Unified Socialist), and is running as one of its candidates for the House of Representatives in the 2022 Nepalese general election.

Biography 
Prakash Jwala was born on 27 November 1966 in Bangad, Nepal. He holds a master's degree, and worked as a teacher prior to entering politics.

In the 1994 Nepalese general election, Jwala ran for the House of Representatives as a member of the Communist Party of Nepal (Unified Marxist–Leninist), standing in the Salyan 1 constituency. Jwala was defeated by Nepali Congress candidate Rajendra Bahadur Shah, receiving 7,930 votes to Shah's 11,714. Jwala ran for the same seat in the 1999 election, defeating Shah in a rematch; Jwala received 8,208 votes, while Shah received 7,089 votes. During his tenure in parliament, Jwala held several leadership positions. During the interim legislature of 2006 and 2007, Jwala served as chairman of the Natural Resources Committee and was the led a parliamentary committee tasked with investigating the financial holdings of King Gyanendra. He later served as chief advisor to Prime Minister Jhala Nath Khanal during the early-2010s and was a member of the CPN (UML) politburo.

In the 2008 election, Jwala ran as a candidate for the 1st Nepalese Constituent Assembly, standing in the Salyan 1 constituency. However, he was defeated by Communist Party of Nepal (Maoist Centre) candidate Tek Bahadur Basnet, receiving 9,487 votes to Basnet's 27,421. Jwala was elected to the 2nd Nepalese Constituent Assembly for the Salyan 2 constituency following the 2013 election. Jwala received 14,829 votes, while his two opponents, Dhrub Raj Puri of the Nepali Congress and Bhim Prakash Sharma of the Maoists, received 10,138 and 9,607 votes, respectively.

After receiving assurances from party leaders, Jwala successfully ran for the newly-formed Karnali Provincial Assembly in the 2017 Nepalese general election. He was elected in the Salyan 1(B) constituency. Following the election and the formation of a coalition government between the CPN (UML) and the Maoists, Jwala was appointed the Minister of Finance of Karnali Province; in this role, he was responsible for overseeing the provincial budget. In 2018, Jwala announced he would run to be the assembly leader of the CPN (UML), but later withdrew his candidacy in favor of Yam Lal Kandel. Jwala's proposed budget for 2020, which would increase spending by allocating funds towards large infrastructure projects and famine and disease prevention, was heavily criticized by other members of the government, who accused Jwala of fiscal malpractice by "distributing government funds as the current fiscal year approached its end" and urged him to resign. Jwala served as minister until 5 April 2021, resigning after the collapse of the coalition government.

On 16 April 2021, the CPN (UML) initiated a vote of no confidence against the Maoist-led government of Mahendra Bahadur Shahi, the chief minister of Karnali Province. Despite the vote being whipped, Jwala and three other CPN (UML) members crossed the floor and supported the Shahi government. The following week, all four were expelled from both the party and the assembly. Later in 2021, Jwala joined the newly-formed Communist Party of Nepal (Unified Socialist), becoming the party's deputy secretary general and the leader of the party in Karnali Province.

In the 2022 Nepalese general election, Jwala ran for the House of Representatives, standing in the Salyan 1 constituency as a member of the CPN (Unified Socialist). He defeated Rajendra Bir Rai of the CPN (UML). Jwala received 35,700 votes, while Rai received 19,789 votes. In his role as the his party's deputy secretary general, Jwala co-wrote the party's manifesto for the 2022 election; in it, Jwala announced plans to expand Nepal's highway infrastructure, create a net-surplus of food, and incentivize rural development.

References 

1966 births
People from Salyan District, Nepal
Living people
20th-century Nepalese educators
20th-century Nepalese politicians
21st-century Nepalese politicians
Communist Party of Nepal (Unified Marxist–Leninist) politicians
Communist Party of Nepal (Unified Socialist) politicians
Provincial cabinet ministers of Nepal
Members of the 2nd Nepalese Constituent Assembly
Nepal MPs 1999–2002
Members of the Provincial Assembly of Karnali Province
Nepal MPs 2022–present